Geobotanically, Arkansas belongs to the North American Atlantic Region.

Rare Species

A
Amorpha ouachitensis - Ouachita leadplant
Amorpha paniculata - Panicled indigobush
Amsonia hubrichtii - Ouachita blue star
Astragalus soxmaniorum - Soxmans' milk-vetch

B

C

Calamagrostis porteri ssp. insperata - Ofer hollow reed grass
Calamovilfa arcuata - A sandgrass
Carex decomposita - Epiphytic sedge
Carex latebracteata - Waterfall's sedge
Carex shinnersii - Shinner's sedge
Carex timida - A sedge
Castanea pumila var. ozarkensis - Ozark chinquapin
Chelone obliqua var. speciosa - Rose turtlehead
Cunila origanoides - American dittany, mountain oregano
Cyperus grayoides - Umbrella sedge
Cypripedium kentuckiense - Southern lady's-slipper

D
Delphinium newtonianum - Moore's larkspur
Delphinium treleasei - Trelease's larkspur
Dodecatheon frenchii - French's shootingstar
Draba aprica - Open-ground whitlow-grass
Datura

E
Echinacea paradoxa - Bush's yellow coneflower
Echinacea sanguinea - A coneflower
Eriocaulon koernickianum - Dwarf pipewort

F
Fothergilla major - Witch-alder

G
Galium arkansanum - A bedstraw

H

Hamamelis vernalis - Ozark Witch Hazel
Harperella nodosa (syn. Ptilimnium nodosum) - Harperella
Helianthus occidentalis ssp. plantagineus - Shinner's sunflower
Heuchera villosa var. arkansana - Arkansas alumroot
Houstonia ouachitana - Ouachita bluet
Hydrophyllum brownei - Browne's waterleaf

I

J

K

L

Leitneria floridana - Corkwood
Liatris squarrosa var. compacta - A blazing star
Lobelia siphilitica - Great Blue Lobelia
Lysimachia quadriflora

M
Mespilus canescens - Stern's medlar
Minuartia godfreyi - Godfrey's sandwort

N
Neviusia alabamensis - Alabama snow-wreath

O
Oenothera heterophylla ssp. orientalis - An evening primrose
Oenothera pilosella ssp. sessilis - Prairie evening primrose

P
Polymnia cossatotensis - Cossatot leafcup

Q
Quercus acerifolia - Maple-leaved oak
Quercus arkansana - Arkansas oak

R

S

Schisandra glabra - Climbing magnolia
Schoenolirion wrightii - Texas sunnybell
Scutellaria bushii - Bush's skullcap
Silene ovata - Ovate-leaf catchfly
Silene regia - Royal catchfly
Solidago ouachitensis - Ouachita goldenrod
Streptanthus maculatus ssp. obtusifolius - A twistflower
Streptanthus squamiformis - A twistflower

T
Thalictrum arkansanum - Arkansas meadow-rue
Tradescantia longipes - Dwarf spiderwort
Tradescantia ozarkana - Ozark spiderwort
Trillium pusillum var. ozarkanum - Ozark least trillium
Trillium viridescens - Ozark trillium

U

V

Valerianella nuttallii - Nuttall corn-salad
Valerianella palmeri - Palmer's corn-salad
Valerianella ozarkana - Ozark corn-salad
Vernonia arkansana - Arkansas ironweed
Vernonia lettermannii - Narrowleaf ironweed

W

X

Y

Z

Common Trees 

Pinus echinata - Shortleaf Pine 
Other Pinus species also common
Juglans nigra - Black Walnut
Carya ovata - Shagbark Hickory
Other Carya species also common
Betula nigra - River Birch
Quercus alba - White Oak
Other Quercus species also common
Sassafras albidum - Sassafras
Liquidambar styraciflua - Sweetgum
Platanus occidentalis - American Sycamore
Malus sylvestris - Common Apple (Arkansas State Flower is the Apple Blossom)
Acer negundo - Box Elder
Acer species - Maples
Cornus florida - Flowering Dogwood
Juniperus virginiana - Eastern Redcedar
Rhus glabra - Smooth Sumac
Other Rhus species also common
Diospyros virginiana - American Persimmon
Prunus serotina - Black Cherry
Prunus virginiana - Chokecherry
Prunus americana - Wild Plum
Other Prunus species also common
Ulmus alata - Winged Elm
Ulmus americana - American Elm
Other Ulmus species also common
Salix nigra - Black Willow

Common Shrubs 

Euonymus - Euonymus, Marble Queen
Rubus species - Brambles, Blackberries, Dewberries
Rhus species - Sumacs
Rosa species - Wild roses
Sambucus species - Elderberries

 
Flora
Arkansas, List
L